The Fujairah International Marine Club (FIMC, now rebranded as the Marine Sports Club) is a club dedicated to recreational boating in Fujairah City, Emirate of Fujairah, United Arab Emirates.

FIMC was founded in 1999, with the patronage of Sheikh Hamad bin Mohammed Al Sharqi, the Ruler of Fujairah. Facilities include fishing trips, jet skiing and speed boats. FIMC organizes deep sea fishing trips. There is a small beach and also a diving club. The club has marina berthing facilities for 120 boats, with a workshop for repairs. The club also organizes championships (e.g., the annual Formula 2000 powerboat championships and jet ski competitions) and other events (e.g., dhow sailing races). There are restaurants and a bar at the club.

The club is located on the Fujairah Corniche, off Al Corniche Road. To the north at the Hilton Fujairah hotel and beyond that Fujairah Beach.

See also
 Dubai International Marine Club

References

External links

 
 
 
 

1999 establishments in the United Arab Emirates
Sports clubs established in 1999
Sports clubs in the United Arab Emirates
Marinas in the United Arab Emirates
Organisations based in the Emirate of Fujairah
Buildings and structures in the Emirate of Fujairah
Sport in the Emirate of Fujairah
Fujairah City
Yacht clubs in Asia
Motorboat racing